Ytterbium dirhodium disilicide (YbRh2Si2), also abbreviated YRS, is a heavy fermion solid state compound of ytterbium, rhodium and silicon. It becomes superconducting when cooled to 2 mK. Just above this temperature the heat capacity is extremely high, and the electrons behave as if they were 1,000,000 times heavier than they really are.

See also
Quantum critical point
Quantum entanglement

References

Rhodium compounds
Silicides
Ytterbium compounds